Helmut Hermann (born 16 December 1966) is a retired German football player.

References

External links
  

1966 births
Living people
German footballers
Karlsruher SC players
Karlsruher SC II players
Bundesliga players
2. Bundesliga players
Footballers from Karlsruhe
Association football forwards
20th-century German people